Tatyana Mezhentseva (born 14 December 2009), better known as Tanya Mezhentseva, is a Russian singer. She, along with Denberel Oorzhak, represented Russia at the Junior Eurovision Song Contest 2019 in Gliwice, Poland, with their song "A Time for Us", placing thirteenth. Mezhentseva was again selected, this time as a solo performer, to represent her country at the Junior Eurovision Song Contest 2021 in Paris, France, with the song "Mon Ami", eventually placing seventh. This made her the third Junior Eurovision Song Contest entrant to compete twice, after Ekaterina Ryabova for Russia in 2009 and 2011 and Lerika for Moldova in 2011 and for Russia in 2012.

Early life
Tatyana Mezhentseva was born in Moscow, Russia, on 14 December 2009. She began singing at the age of four. She studied at the Pop Art Workshop under the direction of Alla Pugacheva and later became a student at the Igor Krutoy Academy. At the competition New Wave Junior (Russian: Детская Новая волна) held in Crimea, Mezhentseva met and befriended Denberel Oorzhak, and they decided to make a duet.

Career

Junior Eurovision Song Contest 2019
They won the national selection and were set to represent Russia at the contest.

During the opening ceremony and the running-order draw which took place on 18 November 2019, Russia was drawn to perform third on 24 November 2019, following France and preceding North Macedonia. On 24 November 2019, the duo performed in the final of the contest, placing 13th with 72 points.

Junior Eurovision Song Contest 2021
On 30 October 2021, Mezhentseva attended  again, but this time as a solo artist, performing the song "". Of the twelve participating acts, she placed third with the professional jury with 36 points, and topped the online vote, receiving almost 20% of the votes. She won the competition and earned the right to represent Russia in the Junior Eurovision Song Contest 2021 in Paris, France. This time, she was more successful, reaching 7th place out of 19 participants. She was the last Russian in any Eurovision event as Russia got banned from the EBU 2 months later.

Discography

Singles

References 

Russian child singers
Junior Eurovision Song Contest entrants
Junior Eurovision Song Contest entrants for Russia
Living people
21st-century Russian women singers
21st-century Russian singers
2009 births
Russian pop singers
Musicians from Moscow